Rokometni klub Jeruzalem Ormož, commonly referred to as RK Jeruzalem Ormož or simply Jeruzalem Ormož, is a team handball club from Ormož, Slovenia. Currently, it competes in the Slovenian First League of Handball.

References

External links
Official website 

Slovenian handball clubs
Handball clubs established in 1957
1957 establishments in Slovenia
Styria (Slovenia)